We're All Alone in This Together is the second studio album by British rapper Dave, released on 23 July 2021 by Neighbourhood Recordings. The album succeeds the debut album Psychodrama, released in 2019, and includes guest appearances from Stormzy, James Blake, Wizkid, Snoh Aalegra, Boj,  Fredo, Ghetts, Giggs and Meekz. We're All Alone in This Together was executive produced by Kyle Evans and Dave himself, with additional production from James Blake and Joe Reeves.

The album follows the themes of loneliness and mental health, as well as social commentary on the conditions faced by young black people in society.

We're All Alone in This Together was supported by two singles: "Clash" featuring Stormzy, and "Verdansk", which reached number two and four respectively on the UK Singles Chart. The album received universal critical acclaim, with many comparing it favourably to its predecessor, Psychodrama.

Background
In April 2021, Dave released two songs as a two-track EP, "Titanium" and "Mercury" featuring Kamal, labelled as leftovers from his second album. Two months later, Dave announced We're All Alone in This Together, alongside its cover art and release date. Dave revealed that the title was inspired by Hans Zimmer, with it coming from a line that the composer had said to him during a conversation. The album art itself is re-interpretation of French painter Claude Monet’s ‘Impression, Soleil Levant’ (‘Impression, Sunrise’). Dave said that the two people in the boat on the cover represented him and his mum and, also, everyone who tries for a better life in the United Kingdom 

The lead single, "Clash" featuring Stormzy, was released on 9 July 2021. It peaked at number two on the UK Singles Chart in the chart week ending 30 July.

Critical reception

We're All Alone in This Together received widespread acclaim from music critics. At Metacritic, which assigns a normalised score out of 100 to ratings from publications, the album received an average score of 92 based on 11 reviews, indicating "universal acclaim". Reviewing the album, David Smyth of the Evening Standard called Dave "the greatest rapper working in Britain today". In a five-star review, Kyann-Sian Williams of NME wrote that the album is a "stunning sequel [that] lives up to his debut".

Commercial performance 
We're All Alone in This Together debuted at number one on the UK Albums Chart, selling 74,000 album equivalent units first week, becoming Dave's second consecutive number one album. It made for the biggest UK album launch of 2021 at the time of release, beating out Olivia Rodrigo's Sour which sold 51,000 first week. Single "Clash" and two other songs for the album charted on the UK Singles Chart: "Clash" (2), "Verdansk" (4), and "In the Fire" (6). UK chart rules prevent artists from having more than three songs in the top 40 at once, otherwise Dave's album would have generated further new entries in the countdown. We're All Alone in This Together returned to number one on the UK charts, on 13 August 2021.

Track listing

Notes
  signifies an additional producer
  signifies a co-producer
 "We're All Alone" features additional vocals from Molly Cowan and The Music Confectionary
 "In the Fire" features vocals from Fredo, Meekz, Ghetts and Giggs and additional vocals from Nathan Tettey
 "Three Rivers" and "System" features additional vocals from The Music Confectionary
 "Three Rivers" and "Survivor's Guilt" features additional vocals from Daniel Kaluuya
 "Both Sides of a Smile" features additional vocals from ShaSimone and Nathan Tettey
 "Twenty to One" features additional vocals from James Blake and The Music Confectionary
 "Heart Attack" features additional vocals from The Music Confectionary
 "Survivor's Guilt" features vocals from Jorja Smith

Sample credits
 "In the Fire" contains samples of "Have You Been Tried in the Fire", performed by The Florida Mass Choir

Personnel
Credits adapted from album's liner notes.

 Dave – vocals, production (tracks 1, 4, 5, 10-12)
 James Blake – production (track 4, 5, 9, 11)
 Dominic Maker – production
 P2J – production (tracks 6, 7, 10)
 Kyle Evans – production, instruments
 Jonny Leslie – engineering
 Leandro "Dro" Hidalgo – mixing (all tracks)
 Daniel Kaluuya – additional vocals
 Tobie Tripp – strings and arrangement (tracks 1, 5)
 ShaSimone – additional vocals (track 9)
 Nathan Tettey – additional vocals
 The Music Confectionary – additional vocals
 Molly Cowan – additional vocals (track 1)
 Evelyn Maillard – piano (track 1)
 Olivia Williams – choir arrangement
 Joe Reeves – production, guitar (tracks 6, 7, 10)
 Emmanuel Asamoah – saxophone (track 6)
 Jae5 – production, synths (track 6)
 Joshua "McKnasty" McKenzie – marching drums (track 1)
 Teniola Abosede – choir arrangement
 Aleysha Gordon – choir arrangement
 Nana Rogues – production, flute (track 2)
 Joel Peters – engineering (track 2)
 Luke Pickening – engineering (track 12)
 Leandro “Dro” Hidalgo – mastering (all tracks)

Charts

Weekly charts

Year-end charts

Certifications

References

2021 albums
Dave (rapper) albums
Albums produced by Dave (rapper)
Albums produced by Dominic Maker
Albums produced by James Blake (musician)